Malapalud is a former municipality in the district of Échallens in the canton of Vaud in Switzerland. On 1 January 2009, it was merged with the municipality of Assens.

History
Malapalud may have been first mentioned in 1429.

Geography
Malapalud is located in the Gros-de-Vaud region.

Coat of arms
The blazon of the municipal coat of arms is Azure, three Bars wavy Argent.

Demographics
Malapalud has a population of 68.

Most of the population speaks French (47 or 77.0%), with German being second most common (9 or 14.8%) and Portuguese being third (4 or 6.6%).

Of the population in the village 29 or about 47.5% were born in Malapalud and lived there in 2000.  There were 11 or 18.0% who were born in the same canton, while 14 or 23.0% were born somewhere else in Switzerland, and 7 or 11.5% were born outside of Switzerland.

In  there were 2 live births to Swiss citizens and 1 death of a Swiss citizen.  Ignoring immigration and emigration, the population of Swiss citizens increased by 1 while the foreign population remained the same.  There was 1 Swiss man who emigrated from Switzerland.  At the same time, there was 1 non-Swiss man who immigrated from another country to Switzerland.  The total Swiss population change in 2008 (from all sources, including moves across municipal borders) was an increase of 15 and the non-Swiss population increased by 2 people.  This represents a population growth rate of 22.7%.

, there were 24 people who were single and never married in the village.  There were 34 married individuals, 1 widow or widower and 2 individuals who are divorced.

There were 5 households that consist of only one person and 4 households with five or more people.  Out of a total of 22 households that answered this question, 22.7% were households made up of just one person.  Of the rest of the households, there are 8 married couples without children, 9 married couples with children.

 there were 3 single-family homes (or 21.4% of the total) out of a total of 14 inhabited buildings.  There were 5 multi-family buildings (35.7%) and along with 6 multi-purpose buildings that were mostly used for housing (42.9%).  Of the single-family homes 0 were built before 1919, while 1 was built between 1990 and 2000.  The greatest number of single-family homes (2) were built between 1981 and 1990.  The most multi-family homes (3) were built before 1919 and the next most (1) were built between 1919 and 1945.

 there were 29 apartments in the village.  The most common apartment size was 2 rooms of which there were 7.  There were 0 single room apartments and 10 apartments with five or more rooms.  Of these apartments, a total of 22 apartments (75.9% of the total) were permanently occupied, while 7 apartments (24.1%) were seasonally occupied.

The historical population is given in the following chart:

Politics
In the 2007 federal election the most popular party was the CVP which received 44.52% of the vote.  The next three most popular parties were the SVP (18.88%), the SP (10.72%) and the FDP (10.26%).  In the federal election, a total of 27 votes were cast, and the voter turnout was 62.8%.

Economy
There were 30 residents of the village who were employed in some capacity, of which females made up 36.7% of the workforce.

 the total number of full-time equivalent jobs was 22.  The number of jobs in the primary sector was 15, all of which were in agriculture.  The number of jobs in the secondary sector was 1, in manufacturing.  The number of jobs in the tertiary sector was 6, all in the sale or repair of motor vehicles.  , there were 15 workers who commuted away from the village.

Religion

Education
In Malapalud about 17 or (27.9%) of the population have completed non-mandatory upper secondary education, and 6 or (9.8%) have completed additional higher education (either University or a Fachhochschule).  Of the 6 who completed tertiary schooling, 66.7% were Swiss men, 33.3% were Swiss women.

, there were 11 students from Malapalud who attended schools outside the village.

References

Former municipalities of the canton of Vaud